Déguéré is a village and seat of the commune of Bamba in the Cercle of Koro in the Mopti Region of southern-central Mali. The village sits on the edge of the Dogon Plateau.

Déguéré (locally pronounced as Dégérè) is the administrative centre (chef-lieu)  of Bamba village cluster. Déguéré village is located at the base of a mountain, and hosts a weekly Saturday market. There are fishing ponds near the village, and local villagers regularly partake in fishing festivals. Jamsay Dogon is spoken in the commune.

References

Populated places in Mopti Region